Stati d'immaginazione is the sixteenth studio album by the Italian progressive rock band Premiata Forneria Marconi, released in 2006. It was distributed in a double edition containing a CD and a DVD; the latter contains eight shorts which, in concert, are presented to the public on the big screen. The images of the videos and the music of the album were conceived as a multimedia work, based on a project by Iaia De Capitani, manager of the group.

Track listing

DVD
The DVD's track list is similar to the CD. It also features images from cities, landscapes, cartoons and black and white scenes from the African native people.

Personnel
 Franz Di Cioccio - Drums, Percussion, Vocals
 Patrick Djivas - Bass, Fretless Bass, Flute
 Franco Mussida - Electric, Classical and Acoustic Guitars, Vocals
 Lucio Fabbri - Violin, Keyboards and Guitar
 Gianluca Tagliavini - Keyboards

Premiata Forneria Marconi albums